Lucky Louie is an American television sitcom created by Louis C.K., which aired on HBO in the U.S. for one season in 2006 — and in Canada on Movie Central, The Movie Network, and The Comedy Network. As the show's creator, writer and executive producer, C.K. also starred as the eponymous central character, a part-time mechanic at a muffler shop.

A first for HBO, Lucky Louie was filmed before a live studio audience, in a multiple-camera setup. Inspired by Norman Lear's sitcoms, the show depicts the life of an average working class family while using spartan sets and wardrobe.  Dealing with a range of topics including sex and racism, the series uses considerable adult language and featured guest stars best known as stand-up comedians, including Jim Norton, Laura Kightlinger, Nick DiPaolo, Todd Barry and Rick Shapiro.

HBO ordered 12 episodes, which aired during the 2006 summer season, as well as eight scripts for a second season, before canceling the show in September 2006 — for numerous reasons ranging from the nature of the show to network economic pressure.

Plot 
The show follows the life of Louie, a working class part-time mechanic at a muffler shop owned by his best friend Mike; Louie's wife, Kim, a full-time nurse and the family breadwinner (Pamela Adlon); and their four-year-old daughter, Lucy (Kelly Gould).

Cast

Crew 
Louis C.K. served as creator, star, head writer and executive producer.  Mike Royce served as showrunner and executive producer. Other executive producers included Dave Becky and Vic Kaplan. Writers included C.K. and Royce, Kit Boss (co-executive producer), Patricia Breen (executive story editor), Jon Ross (executive story editor), Mary Fitzgerald (staff writer), Greg Fitzsimmons (staff writer), Dan Mintz (staff writer), Dino Stamatopoulos (writer), and Aaron Shure (consulting producer), formerly of Everybody Loves Raymond.

The theme, entitled "Lucky Louie Theme", was composed by Mark Rivers. The animated title sequence was by David Tristman.

Andrew D. Weyman served as the series' main director. Producers on the show were Leo Clarke and Andrew D. Weyman. The associate producer was Ralph Paredes. and the consulting producer was Tracy Katsky.

Episodes

Critical reception 
Lucky Louie received mixed reviews from critics and holds a Metacritic score of 47 out of 100 based on 19 reviews.

Home media 
HBO released the entire series of Lucky Louie on January 30, 2007. It includes an unaired episode "Clowntime is Over". The DVD also includes four commentaries and a look at the taping of an episode.

Criticism 
In August 2006, during the show's run, Bill Donohue, president of the American organization Catholic League for Religious and Civil Rights, issued a news release about Lucky Louie, calling the series "barbaric". The release provides a bulleted list of content from the show that the organization finds obscene, from the ten episodes that had been broadcast at that time. In January 2007, Louis C.K. was a guest in studio on the Opie & Anthony radio show (co-hosted by Jim Norton, who plays Rich on Lucky Louie). Donohue appeared on the show as a phone-in guest that day, and C.K. started a conversation with him about his comments on Lucky Louie. C.K. challenged Donohue's news release and accused him of misrepresenting the show by taking things out of context. Donohue admitted that even though the press release bears his name, he had never seen an episode of the show.

See also 
Louie

References

External links 
 

HBO original programming
2006 American television series debuts
2006 American television series endings
2000s American sitcoms
English-language television shows
Television series created by Louis C.K.
Television series by 3 Arts Entertainment
Television series by Home Box Office
Television series by HBO Independent Productions